Thomas Donnelly may refer to:

Thomas Donnelly (Saskatchewan politician) (Thomas F. Donnelly, 1874–1948), Canadian member of Parliament
Thomas Donnelly (sergeant-at-arms) (1764–1835), New York legislative officer
Thomas Donnelly (Alberta politician) (1933–1997), Alberta MLA
Thomas Dean Donnelly, American screenwriter
Thomas F. Donnelly (New York City) (1863–1924), New York politician and judge
Tom Donnelly (Thomas Mathew Donnelly, born 1981), New Zealand rugby union player
Tommy Donnelly (footballer), Irish association football player
Tom Donnelly (footballer) (born 1947), Scottish footballer

See also 
Tommy Donnelly,  a character from the NBC series The Black Donnellys
Giselle Donnelly (born Thomas Donnelly, 1953), American writer and director of the Center for Defense Studies at the American Enterprise Institute